The 1892 Atlantic hurricane season occurred during summer and fall 1892. The season accumulated nine tropical storms, five hurricanes, but no major hurricanes. Three tropical storms made landfall on the United States. However, due to scarce technology and the fact that only storms that affected land or ships were recorded, the actual total could be higher.



Timeline

Systems

Tropical Storm One 

The first tropical storm developed about 45 mi (70 km) south of Isla de la Juventud on June 9. Initially moving northwestward, the storm made landfall later that day on the south coast of Pinar del Río Province in Cuba. The storm recurved northward and entered the Gulf of Mexico early the following morning, where it intensified and peaked with maximum sustained winds of 50 mph (85 km/h). Around that time, it turned to the northeast and made landfall at 23:00 UTC on June 10 in northern Monroe County, Florida, at the same intensity. The cyclone crossed Florida and emerged into the Atlantic Ocean near modern-day Deerfield Beach early the following day. Thereafter, the system headed out to sea for a few days, before re-approaching the Southeastern United States.

In Cuba, moderately gusty winds and torrential rainfall were reported from Santa Clara to Pinar del Río, with the worst impact conditions being experienced in Matanzas. Civil guards and troops assisted rescue work and evacuation of residents. Furniture in 325 houses were swept away by the floodwaters. About 450 head of cattle drowned. Additionally, 600,000 bags of sugar stored in warehouses were lost. The storm left at least 16 deaths and approximately $1.5 million in damage. The storm also brought winds and rains to Florida. In just a few hours, Hypoluxo recorded , while Titusville measured  over a period lasting six days. In Jupiter, multiple trees were downed and severe damage was inflicted on crops.

Hurricane Two 

On August 15, a tropical storm was first seen in the open Atlantic east of the Leeward Islands. It tracked northwestward, becoming a hurricane on August 19 before becoming extratropical on August 21. The extratropical storm hit Newfoundland, and completely lost its identity on August 24.

Hurricane Three 

The third hurricane of the year was a long-lasting storm that formed southwest of the Cape Verde islands on September 3. The unnamed storm did not affect land, peaking at  before dissipating northeast of the Azores islands near Spain on September 17.

Tropical Storm Four 

On September 8, the fourth tropical storm formed in the southwestern Gulf of Mexico northwest of Campeche. After tracking to the northeast, it made landfalls near New Orleans, Louisiana, and near the Louisiana-Mississippi state lines as a moderate tropical storm. On September 13 the storm became extratropical over Tennessee, and lost its identity on September 17 near Greenland.

Hurricane Five 

First recorded east of the Cape Verde Islands on September 12, the hurricane directly affected the islands without officially making landfall before dissipating in the open Atlantic near 37°N, 40°W on September 23. The next time a hurricane would affect the islands was in 2015, when Hurricane Fred made landfall.

Tropical Storm Six 

The sixth tropical storm of the season was a very short-lived storm that was first recorded northwest of Ciudad del Carmen on September 25. The storm travelled northwest across the Bay of Campeche before making landfall near the Mexico-Texas border, dissipating inland on September 27.

Hurricane Seven 

On October 5, the seventh storm of the season formed east of Trinidad and Tobago. It made landfalls on Paraguaná, Guajira, and near Cabo Gracias a Dios on the Nicaragua – Honduras border. It sunk a schooner, which resulted in the deaths of sixteen people  It dissipated inland on October 16.

Hurricane Eight 

The eighth storm of the season formed northeast of the Bahamas on October 13, and briefly threatened Bermuda. However, it never made landfall before becoming extratropical in the open Atlantic on October 18.

Tropical Storm Nine 

The ninth and final tropical storm of the season formed northwest of the Yucatán Peninsula on October 21. It made its single landfall near Tampa, Florida, as a tropical storm. It then tracked east over Central Florida, turned northeast, and lost its identity on October 29 in the open Atlantic.

See also 

 List of tropical cyclones
 Atlantic hurricane season
 HURDAT Data for the 1892 Atlantic hurricane season

References

External links 
 Monthly Weather Review

 
1892 meteorology
1892 natural disasters